The Beanery is a life-size, walk-in artwork  created in 1965 by the American artist Edward Kienholz; it has been referred to as his greatest work, and "one of the most memorable works of late 20th-century art". It represents the interior of a Los Angeles bar, Barney's Beanery.

Modelled at two-thirds the size of the original Beanery, it features the smells and sounds of the bar, and models of customers, all of whom have clocks for faces with the time set at 10:10. Only the model of Barney, the owner, has a real face. Kienholz is quoted as saying "The entire work symbolizes the switch from real time (symbolized by a newspaper) to the surrealist time inside the bar, where people waste time, kill time, forget time, and ignore time".

First exhibited in the parking lot of the bar in October 1965, it is now in the Stedelijk Museum Amsterdam. It was restored in 2012.

References

Installation art works
1965 works
Art in Amsterdam